Fort-Louis is a commune in the Bas-Rhin department in Grand Est in north-eastern France.

It acquired its name and its principal raison d'être from a 17th-century fort, known as Fort Louis. More recently the population of the settlement increased between 1962 and 2004 from 137 to 279.

History
In 1686 the king mandated Vauban to construct a fortification complex at Fort Louis, situated at that time on an island between two branches of the Rhine.   The principal fort, to be called the square fort (Fort Carré) was to be backed up by two fortified bridgeheads, one of which, named Fort Alsace, was to be on the Alsace side of the river, and the other of which, Fort Marquisat, was to be on the Baden side of the river.   During the course of the Franco-German wars of the 18th century the fort was besieged on several occasions, and following the defeat of Napoleon, the square fort (Fort Carré) was dismantled in 1818.   It was later, in 1890, purchased by the commune.   Today, little survives beyond earthworks and some sections of wall from Fort Carré and Fort Alsace.

See also
 Communes of the Bas-Rhin department

References

Communes of Bas-Rhin
Bas-Rhin communes articles needing translation from French Wikipedia
Vauban fortifications in France